Louis Gauthier (12 April 1916 – 6 August 2005) was a French racing cyclist. He rode in the 1947 Tour de France. He finished in second place in the 1946 Paris–Roubaix.

References

External links

1916 births
2005 deaths
French male cyclists
Sportspeople from Saône-et-Loire
Cyclists from Bourgogne-Franche-Comté